Lourency do Nascimento Rodrigues (born 2 January 1996), simply known as Lourency, is a Brazilian footballer who plays as a right winger for Emirati club Al Bataeh.

Club career
Born in Imperatriz, Maranhão, Lourency started his career at JV Lideral's youth setup in 2008, aged 12. After a short loan stint at Sabiá, he joined Internacional in 2014.

Lourency moved to Chapecoense in 2015, after being rarely used at Inter. Initially assigned to the under-20s, he made his first team debut on 30 January 2016, coming on as a late substitute for Ananias in a 2–1 Campeonato Catarinense home win against Internacional de Lages.

Lourency made his Série A debut on 15 May 2016, again replacing Ananias in a 0–0 away draw against former club Internacional. On 16 September he scored his first professional goal, netting the winner in a 2–1 success at Fluminense.

Lourency was not on board the ill-fated LaMia Airlines Flight 2933 that crashed on 28 November 2016, and killed 19 of his teammates, due to a request from Chapecoense's under-20 manager.

Career statistics

Honours
Chapecoense
Campeonato Catarinense: 2016, 2017
Copa Sudamericana: 2016

References

External links

1996 births
Sportspeople from Maranhão
Living people
Brazilian footballers
Association football wingers
Associação Chapecoense de Futebol players
Vila Nova Futebol Clube players
Grêmio Esportivo Brasil players
Gil Vicente F.C. players
Göztepe S.K. footballers
Al Bataeh Club players
Campeonato Catarinense players
Campeonato Brasileiro Série A players
Campeonato Brasileiro Série B players
Primeira Liga players
Süper Lig players
UAE Pro League players
Brazilian expatriate footballers
Brazilian expatriate sportspeople in Portugal
Expatriate footballers in Portugal
Brazilian expatriate sportspeople in Turkey
Expatriate footballers in Turkey
Brazilian expatriate sportspeople in the United Arab Emirates
Expatriate footballers in the United Arab Emirates